The women's 200 metres event at the 2018 African Championships in Athletics was held on 4 and 5 August in Asaba, Nigeria.

Medalists

Results

Heats
Qualification: First 4 of each heat (Q) and the next 4 fastest (q) qualified for the semifinals.

Wind:Heat 1: ? m/s, Heat 2: -0.5 m/s, Heat 3: -0.4 m/s, Heat 4: -0.3 m/s, Heat 5: ? m/s

Semifinals
Qualification: First 2 of each semifinal (Q) and the next 2 fastest (q) qualified for the final.

Wind:Heat 1: +0.1 m/s, Heat 2: +0.2 m/s, Heat 3: +0.1 m/s

Final
Wind: +0.1 m/s

References

2018 African Championships in Athletics
200 metres at the African Championships in Athletics